Sandra Lecour is a Canadian cross-country skier. She represented Canada at the 1984 Winter Paralympics and at the 1988 Winter Paralympics, both held in Innsbruck, Austria. In total she won two gold medals and one bronze medal.

She won the gold medal in the women's short distance 5 km B2 event and also in the women's long distance 10 km B2. She won the bronze medal together with Kim Umback and Tricia Lovegrove in the women's 3x5 km relay B1-3 event.

References 

Living people
Year of birth missing (living people)
Place of birth missing (living people)
Canadian female cross-country skiers
Cross-country skiers at the 1984 Winter Paralympics
Cross-country skiers at the 1988 Winter Paralympics
Medalists at the 1988 Winter Paralympics
Paralympic gold medalists for Canada
Paralympic bronze medalists for Canada
Paralympic cross-country skiers of Canada
Paralympic medalists in cross-country skiing
20th-century Canadian women